This is a list of prominent people executed by the state during the reign of the Tudors. The list is not exhaustive.

In the reign of Henry VII (1485–1509)

In the reign of Henry VIII (1509–1547)

In the reign of Edward VI (1547–1553)

In the reign of Mary I (1553–1558)

In the reign of Elizabeth I (1558–1603) 

Tudors
House of Tudor